Shanghai Tower is a 128-story,  megatall skyscraper in Lujiazui, Pudong, Shanghai. It is  the tallest building in China and the world's third-tallest building by height to architectural top. It is the tallest and largest LEED Platinum certified building in the world since 2015. It shares the record (along with the Ping An Finance Center) of having the world's highest observation deck within a building or structure at 562 m.
 
Designed by international design firm Gensler and owned by the Shanghai Municipal Government, it is the tallest of the world's first triple-adjacent supertall buildings in Pudong, the other two being the Jin Mao Tower and the Shanghai World Financial Center. Its tiered construction, designed for high energy efficiency, provides nine separate zones divided between office, retail and leisure use.

Construction work on the tower began in November 2008 and topped out on 4 August 2013. The exterior was completed in summer 2015, and work was considered complete in September 2014. Although the building was originally scheduled to open to the public in November 2014, the actual public-use date was shifted to February 2015. The observation deck was opened to visitors in July 2016; the period from July through September 2018 was termed a "test run" or "commissioning" period. Since April 26, 2017, the sightseeing deck on the 118th floor has been open to the public.

History

Planning and funding
Planning models for the Lujiazui financial district dating back to 1993 show plans for a close group of three supertall skyscrapers. The first of these, the Jin Mao Tower, was completed in 1999; the adjacent Shanghai World Financial Center (SWFC) opened in 2008.

The Shanghai Tower is owned by Yeti Construction and Development, a consortium of state-owned development companies which includes Shanghai Chengtou Corp., Shanghai Lujiazui Finance & Trade Zone Development Co., and Shanghai Construction Group. Funding for the tower's construction was obtained from shareholders, bank loans, and Shanghai's municipal government. The tower had an estimated construction cost of US$2.4 billion.

Construction
In 2008, the site – previously a driving range – was prepared for construction. A groundbreaking ceremony was held on 29 November 2008, after the tower had passed an environmental impact study. The main construction contractor for the project was Shanghai Construction Group, a member of the consortium that owns the tower.

A repetitive slip-forming process was used to construct the tower's core floor by floor. By late April 2011, the tower's steel reinforcement had risen to the 18th floor, while its concrete core had reached the 15th floor, and floor framing had been completed up to the fourth floor. By late December 2011, the tower's foundations had been completed, and its steel construction had risen above the 30th floor. In the first months of 2012, cracks began appearing in the roads near the tower's construction site. These were blamed on ground subsidence, which was likely caused by excessive groundwater extraction in the Shanghai area, rather than by the weight of the Shanghai Tower.

Construction crews laid the final structural beam of the tower on 3 August 2013, thus topping out the tower as China's tallest, and the world's second-tallest, building. A topping-out ceremony was held at the site of the last beam. During the ceremony, Gensler co-founder Art Gensler stated:

The principal architect of the project, Jun Xia, said: "With the topping out of Shanghai Tower, the Lujiazui trio will serve as a stunning representation of our past, our present, and China’s boundless future." Gu Jianping, general manager of the Shanghai Tower Construction Company, expressed the firm's wish "to provide higher quality office and shopping space, as well as contribute to the completeness of the city skyline's and the entire region's functionality".

In January 2014, the tower's crown structure passed the  mark when its construction entered its final phase. The tower's crown structure was completed in August 2014, and its façade was completed shortly after. The tower's interior construction and electrical fitting-out were completed in late 2014. The opening was gradually introduced during the summer of 2015.

2017 and later
Until June 2017, the tower faced problems attracting tenants due to the absence of all the necessary permits from the local fire department, and consequent impossibility of obtaining the official occupancy permit.

Following a report in June 2017, approximately 60% of its office space has been leased, but only 33% of those tenants have moved in, leaving entire floors of the tower empty; the luxury J hotel has also yet to open. The tower's floor plate has an "efficiency rate of only 50 per cent on some floors, compared with 70 per cent for a typical [skyscraper]", as the tower's "much-talked-about outer skin, which is ideal for allowing in natural light and cuts down on air-conditioning costs... means much of the floor space can’t be used". As of 2019, 55 floors stood empty. Current tenants of the tower include Alibaba, Intesa Sanpaolo  and AllBright Law Offices.

In 2020, major water leaks broke out from the 60th to the 9th floor of the tower, which damaged a large quantity of office equipment and electronics. The tower said the problem was fixed and a comprehensive inspection would be taken on the floor where the leak originated. Some Chinese social media users criticized the leakage as typical of the results of tofu-dreg projects. According to the local newspaper of Shanghai, misinformation videos circulating online showing that the tower's ceiling was collapsed were in fact from a shopping center in Nanning in 2016.

On June 19, 2021, the J Hotel Shanghai Tower opened.

Design
The Shanghai Tower was designed by the American architectural firm Gensler, with Shanghainese architect Jun Xia leading the design team.

The tower takes the form of nine cylindrical buildings stacked atop each other that total 128 floors, all enclosed by the inner layer of the glass facade. Between that and the outer layer, which twists as it rises, nine indoor zones provide public space for visitors. Each of these nine areas has its own atrium, featuring gardens, cafés, restaurants and retail space, and providing panoramic views of the city.

Both layers of the façade are transparent, and retail and event spaces are provided at the tower's base. The transparent façade is a unique design feature, because most buildings have only a single façade using highly reflective glass to reduce heat absorption, but the Shanghai Tower's double layer of glass eliminates the need for either layer to be opaqued. The tower can accommodate as many as 16,000 people daily.

The Shanghai Tower joins the Jin Mao Tower and SWFC to form the world's first adjacent grouping of three supertall buildings. Its 258-room hotel, the J Hotel Shanghai Tower, located between the 84th and 110th floors, is operated by Jin Jiang International Hotels, and is the highest hotel in the world. The tower will also incorporate a museum. The tower's sub-levels provide parking spaces for 1,800 vehicles.

Vertical transportation system
The vertical transportation system of Shanghai Tower was designed by an American consultant, Edgett Williams Consulting Group, with principal Steve Edgett as a primary consultant. Working closely with Gensler's design and technical teams to create a highly efficient core, Edgett created an elevator system in which office floors are served via 4 sky lobbies each served by double-deck shuttle elevators. Access to the hotel is through a 5th sky lobby at levels 101/102. Each 2-level sky lobby serves as a community center for that zone of the building, with such amenities as food and beverage and conference rooms. These three shuttle elevators are supplemented by three fireman's elevators which will significantly increase the visitor throughput to the observation deck at peak usage periods. In the event of a fire or other emergency, the building's shuttle elevators are designed to evacuate occupants from specially-designed refuge floors located at regular intervals throughout the height of the tower.

In September 2011, Mitsubishi Electric announced that it had won a bid to construct the Shanghai Tower's elevator system. When they were installed (2014), they were the world's fastest single-deck elevators and double-deck elevators, respectively. The Shanghai Tower's tuned mass damper, designed to limit swaying at the top of the structure, was the world's largest at the time of its installation.

Sustainability
The Shanghai Tower comprises numerous green architecture components; its owners received certifications from the China Green Building Committee and the U.S. Green Building Council for the building's sustainable design. In 2013, a Gensler spokesman recounted the tower as "the greenest super high-rise building on earth at this point in time". The building is designed to catch rainwater for internal use, and to reuse a portion of its wastewater.

The design of the tower's glass façade, which completes a 120° twist as it rises, is intended to reduce wind loads on the building by 24%. This reduced the amount of construction materials needed; the Shanghai Tower used 25% less structural steel than a conventional design of a similar height. As a result, the building's constructors saved an estimated US$58 million in material costs. Construction practices were also sustainable. Though the majority of the tower's energy will be provided by conventional power systems, 270 vertical-axis wind turbines located in the facade and near the top of the tower are capable of generating up to 350,000 kWh of supplementary electricity per year, and are expected to provide 10% of the building's electrical needs. The double-layered insulating glass façade was designed to reduce the need for indoor air conditioning, and is composed of an advanced reinforced glass with a high tolerance for temperature variations. In addition, the building's heating and cooling systems use geothermal energy sources. Furthermore, rain and waste water are recycled to flush toilets and irrigate the tower's green spaces.

Floor plans

Note: Floor G or 0 is skipped.

See also

 List of tallest buildings in Shanghai
 List of tallest buildings in China
 List of tallest buildings in the world
 List of buildings with 100 floors or more
 List of twisted buildings

References

External links

Shanghai Tower official website 
J Hotel Shanghai Tower official website

Skyscraper office buildings in Shanghai
Twisted buildings and structures
2014 establishments in China
Contemporary Chinese architecture
Buildings and structures completed in 2014
Gensler buildings